Vignale Monferrato is a comune (municipality) in the Province of Alessandria in the Italian region Piedmont, located about  east of Turin and about  northwest of Alessandria.   
Vignale Monferrato borders the following municipalities: Altavilla Monferrato, Camagna Monferrato, Casorzo, Frassinello Monferrato, Fubine, Lu e Cuccaro Monferrato and Olivola.

People
 Eraldo Monzeglio (1906–1981), footballer.
Piero Drogo, car driver and Ferrari designer

References

Vignale Monferrato